Glen Echo is an historic plantation house near Ellabell, Georgia, United States. The house was built circa 1773 and is an early example of Plantation Plain style.  Records show that the land of Glen Echo Plantation was granted in the colonial era through a king's grant to a member of the Bird family.  It was placed on the National Register of Historic Places in 1978.

See also
 National Register of Historic Places listings in Bryan County, Georgia

References

Houses on the National Register of Historic Places in Georgia (U.S. state)
Houses completed in 1773
Houses in Bryan County, Georgia
Plantation houses in Georgia (U.S. state)
National Register of Historic Places in Bryan County, Georgia